The 1990 German Formula Three Championship was a multi-event motor racing championship for single-seat open wheel formula racing cars held across Europe. The championship featured drivers competing in two-litre Formula Three racing cars which conform to the technical regulations, or formula, for the championship. It commenced on 31 March at Zolder and ended at Hockenheim on 13 October after eleven rounds.

West WTS Racing driver Michael Schumacher became a champion. He won five races and collected another two podium finishes to achieve the championship title. Otto Rensing finished as runner-up, winning at Hockenheimring and Norisring. Wolfgang Kaufmann was victorious at Zolder and Nürburgring, completing the top three in the drivers' championship. Peter Zakowski was the other race winner. Franz Binder clinched the B-Cup championship title.

Teams and drivers
{|
|

Calendar

Results

Championship standings

A-Class
Points are awarded as follows:

References

External links
 

German Formula Three Championship seasons
Formula Three season